Aberdare Rugby Football Club is a Rugby Union club based in the town of Aberdare, Wales. Aberdare RFC play in the Welsh Rugby Union Division Two East Central and is a feeder club to Cardiff Rugby.

Club history

The first mention of an Aberdare club came in 1876, when on 30/11/1876 Aberdare played away to Merthyr, losing by two tries. In September 1883 it was decided to "re-start" the Aberdare club.

Aberdare RUFC began as Aberaman Rugby Football Club, a team formed in 1890, though the earliest written conformation of their existence is from a match in 1895 against a team from Ferndale. In the early 1900s the team joined the Glamorgan league, playing other coal mining towns such as Maesteg, Treorchy and Treherbert.

In 1907 Aberdare were involved in an early rugby scandal linked to professionalism. Local collier Dai 'Tarw' Jones was one of Aberdare's star players and captained the club from 1905 to 1907. For his services to the club he was paid 10 shillings a week along with meal costs and train fares. When the club cut the wage to 5 shillings, Jones switched allegiance to Treherbert, commuting from his home town of Aberdare on match days. Aberdare's ex-secretary E. Rees in 1907 made several allegations in the press that broke multiple union rules. Not only did he mention the wages but also stated that leading teams had been paid to visit the town and stated Aberdare was involved in match fixing. During the 1904/05 season, Aberdare won the Glamorgan League by beating Treorchy in the last match. Rees claimed that Treorchy had agreed to lose the game for £15.

The resulting investigation from the WRU, at the time still called the Welsh Football Union, spread far further than the two clubs mentioned by Rees. The union saw 6 players temporarily suspended, including Welsh international Fred Scrine, Merthyr escaped with a warning but Treorchy and Aberdare saw the permanent suspension of their entire committees. The union also permanently suspended eight players, including Jones who switched to rugby league. The events of the investigation led to bad feeling in the rugby community of Aberdare, and was a major factor in Aberdare founding Aberdare RLFC, one of the first professional rugby league clubs and member of the Welsh League. This combination of the change to Northern League and the resultant 1908 team photo, which featured several players wearing 'snake belts' to hold up their shorts, gave rise to the nickname of "The Snakes".

During the 2015/2016 season Aberdare RUFC were crowned champions of Welsh Rugby Union's Division 3 East Central A. Aberdare RUFC were confirmed champions on 27 April 2016 with a 47–30 victory over Cardiff based side Fairwater RFC with two games to spare. This was notably one of Aberdare's most successful seasons since the club's formation in 1890, being only the second side in the 125-year history to be crowned champions of their respective league. Fittingly Aberdare RUFC celebrated becoming league champions on their 125th Anniversary year. This side, that was led by Captain Daniel William Lewis was well known for the exciting brand of running rugby they brought to the table scoring over 100 tries during the season and notching up over 700 points in the "for" column, 200 points more than their closest competitors. There was only one recorded loss in the league during the campaign and this reflected the team's excellent defensive displays.

Club Honours
19th Century:

1899/1900 Glamorgan Press Cup Winners

20th Century:

1901/02 Glamorgan Times Cup Winners
1904/05 Glamorgan League Champions
1982/83 Mid District Section D Champions

21st Century:

2015/16 WRU 3 East Central A Champions

2016/17 Mid District Bowl Winners

Notable players
British & Irish Lions:
  Dai Young (3 caps)
  Keith Rowlands (3 caps)

Wales:

  Dai Young (51 caps)
  Dai 'Tarw' Jones (13 caps)
  Dai Evans (12 caps)
  Keith Rowlands (5 caps)
  Owen Williams (4 caps)
  Thomas Young (4 caps)

Wales 7s:

 Rhys Shellard
  Owen Williams

Other Internationals:

  Aaron Freeman (2 caps)

References

External links
Aberdare RFC Official website

Rugby clubs established in 1890
1890 establishments in Wales
Welsh rugby union teams
Sport in Aberdare